The 1893 Virginia gubernatorial election was held on November 7, 1893 to elect the governor of Virginia.

Results

References

1893
Virginia
gubernatorial
November 1893 events